Triosence is a German jazz group founded in 1999. The members are Bernhard Schüler (piano), Matthias Nowak (bass), and Stephan Emig (drums).

History
The band was founded in 1999. Their name comes from "trio" and "essence" to emphasize their collaborative approach. The band combines jazz, folk, world, and fusion. Members cite as influences Bill Evans, Peter Erskine, Jack DeJohnette, Zakir Hussain, Ahmad Jamal, Keith Jarrett, Hubert Nuss, and John Taylor.

They received a recording contract with the German national radio network Deutschlandfunk. Their first album, First Enchantment, was nominated for the Preis der deutschen Schallplattenkritik. Their second, Away for Awhile, remained in the German International jazz chart for over six months.

Beginning in 2008, Triosence worked with American singer Sara Gazarek on the album Where Time Stands Still. They communicated through telephone and on the computer via email and Skype. Schuler traveled to the U.S. in 2009, followed later by the rest of the trio, and they performed together for the first time. Gazarek recorded the album with Triosence in Bonn, Germany, but it did not appear in the U.S. until 2012. Schüler called the album "European jazz with an American accent". 

Triosence won the national competition Jugend jazzt, the Ostsee (Baltic Sea) Jazz Festival,} and the Kulturforderpreis of Kassel.

Biographies
Bernhard Schüler was born on September 19, 1979, in Kassel, Germany, and began his musical formation at the age of 7 on piano. As a teenager he began to compose music. He founded his first group in 1996 and was its saxophonist, bandleader, and composer. He won the competition Jugend jazzt in 1996 and 1999, before winning it again with Triosence. From 1999 to 2004 he studied music at the Cologne University of Music.

Stephan Emig was born on January 7, 1976, in Kassel, Germany. At 13 years old he began learning the drums. He continued his musical formation at the Modern Music School in Giessen and the Los Angeles Music Academy. Since 1998 he has been working as a professional drummer and producer.

Matthias Akeo Nowak was born in 1976 in Berlin, Germany. He studied music for orchestras and jazz at the University for Music and Art in Mannheim and Detmold. He was a member of the Jungen Deutschen Philharmonie (Young German Philharmonic) and the Jungen Österreichischen Philharmonie (Young Austrian Philharmonic). He has worked with John Ruocco, Jürgen Friedrich, Dejan Terzic, Rudi Mahall, Christopher Dell, and Oliver Leicht and has toured Germany, France, Albania, U.S., and Italy.

Discography 
 First Enchantment (Mons, 2002)
 Away for Awhile (Mons, 2005)
 When You Come Home (Sony BMG, 2008)
 Where Time Stands Still with Sara Gazarek (Charleston Square, 2012)
 One Summer Night (Mons, 2013)
 Turning Points (Sony, 2013)
 Hidden Beauty (Okeh, 2017)
 Scorpio Rising (Sony, 2019)
 Giulia (Sony, 2022)

References

External links 
 Official site

German musical trios
German jazz ensembles
Okeh Records artists